Moliagul is a small township in Victoria, Australia,  northwest of Melbourne and  west of Bendigo. The town's name is believed to be a derivation of the aboriginal word "moliagulk", meaning "wooded hill". The area is notable for the discovery of a number of gold nuggets. These finds include the world's largest, the Welcome Stranger, which was discovered in 1869 by John Deason and Richard Oates.

From what was once a thriving goldfields town, Moliagul today is a virtual ghost town and consists of a number of scattered houses. In 1855 it is estimated there were 16,000 people living in the immediate area during the peak of the Victorian gold rush period. Moliagul Post Office opened on 15 November 1858 and closed in 1971.

The town is composed of scattered rural dwellings and small farms, a hotel (now closed), museum, the old school (now a hall) and former church. There are a number of historical sites including a stone monument to the Reverend John Flynn, founder of the Royal Flying Doctor Service of Australia, who was born in Moliagul in 1880.

The nearby Moliagul Cemetery contains the headstones of many families, such as the Deason's, which date back to the gold rush times. Within a few kilometers of the town can be found various gold mining areas including the site of the Welcome Stranger.

Mount Moliagul itself is visible from the town.

Early history
In late 1852, gold was discovered in Queen's Gully and the settlement of Moliagul sprang up almost immediately.  By January of the next year, a store, a butcher's shop and a blacksmith's forge had opened but almost immediately the new settlement was abandoned as people departed for the Sandy Creek gold rush. In July 1855, gold was found at Little Hill and a second gold rush occurred in the Moliagul area. In 1856 the Mount Moliagul Hotel opened for business.

References

Notes
 The travelers guide to the Goldfields: History and natural heritage trails through Central and Western Victoria. Torquay, Bestshot, 2006.

External links

Towns in Victoria (Australia)
Ghost towns in Victoria (Australia)
Mining towns in Victoria (Australia)
Populated places established in the 1850s